The Pakistan men's national volleyball team represents Pakistan in international volleyball competitions.

Pakistan Volleyball Federation was founded on 31 January 1955. Thereafter, volleyball was taken up at the national level. The Federation received recognition and was affiliated to the Pakistan Olympic Association and the International Volleyball Federation the same year.

In Pakistan, during the fifties and sixties, the standard of volleyball was quite high and comparable to the best Asian countries. Pakistan had the honour of winning a bronze medal during the 1962 Asian Games at Jakarta where the matches were played outdoor. Ch Ghulam Hussain was the coach of National Team at that time.

Results
Asian Volleyball Confederation - Central Asian Zonal Volleyball Association

Asian Championship

 1975 – Did not participate
 1979 – Did not participate
 1983 – Did not participate
 1987 – 7th place
 1989 – 4th place
 1991 – 8th place
 1993 – 8th place
 1995 – 8th place
 1997 – 7th place
 1999 – 8th place
 2001 – Did not participate
 2003 – 7th place
 2005 – 9th place
 2007 – 13th place
 2009 – Did not participate
 2011 – 7th place
 2013 – Did not participate
 2015 – 10th place
 2017 – 12th place
 2019 – 7th place
 2021 – 7th place

Asian Games

1962: Bronze

1966

1970

Asian Cup

2008 to 2018 – Did not enter or qualify
 2022 – 6th place

South Asian Games

Volleyball at the 2019 South Asian Games: Silver

Team
Head Coach:  Cristiano Rodrigues Campos

Players : 
Aimal Khan(Captain),
Mubashir Raza,
Murad Jehan Bannuzai,
Murad Khan,
Bilal Khan,
Muhammad Waseem,
Usman Faryad,
Kashif Naveed,
Mazhar Ali,
Abdullah Abdullah,
Afaq Khan,
Muhammad Zaheer,
Muhammad Hamad,
Hamid Yazman,
Ahmed Nazir,
Nasir Ali.

Head Coaches
 Hamid Mohavedi (2017–2019)
 Kim Kyoung-hoon (2019)
 Rahman Mohammadirad (2021)
 Cristiano Rodrigues Campos (2022–present)

External links

References

Volleyball
National men's volleyball teams
Volleyball in Pakistan
Men's sport in Pakistan